Moberly Lake Provincial Park is a provincial park in British Columbia, Canada.

References
BC Parks webpage

External links

Peace River Regional District
Provincial parks of British Columbia
Peace River Country
1966 establishments in British Columbia
Protected areas established in 1966